Krascheninnikovia ceratoides, the Pamirian winterfat, is a plant species native to Central Europe and Southern Europe, North Africa, and parts of Asia. It has been reported from Russia, China, Mongolia, Pakistan, Kazakhstan, Uzbekistan, Iran, Afghanistan, Ukraine, Egypt, Morocco, Spain, Austria, Slovakia, Czech Republic, and Romania.

Krascheninnikovia ceratoides is a shrub up to 100 cm tall, appearing whitish because of a thick layer of finely branched hairs. Leaves are highly variable in shape, up to 25 mm long. Flowers are tiny, covered with long silky hairs, borne in axillary clusters and a terminal raceme; staminate (male, pollen-producing) and pistillate (female, seed-producing) organs are in different flowers on the same plant. Fruit is egg-shaped, about 3 mm long, with 4 angles and 2 horns.

References

External links
GBIF Worldwide occurrence data: Krascheninnikovia ceratoides

Chenopodioideae
Halophytes
Flora of Asia
Flora of Europe
Flora of Egypt
Flora of Morocco